Global Underground 031: Dubfire, Taipei is a DJ mix album in the Global Underground series, compiled and mixed by DJ and producer Ali "Dubfire" Shirazinia, one half of progressive house duo Deep Dish.  Dubfire's release follows that of his Deep Dish collaborator, Sharam's solo mix, Global Underground 029: Dubai. Previously, Deep Dish have mixed Global Underground 021: Moscow and Global Underground 025: Toronto, along with Afterclub Mixes.  With Taipei, Dubfire sought to make the album about more who he is, as opposed to Deep Dish.

The album peaked at #16 on the Billboard Top Electronic Albums chart.

Track listing

Disc one
The Low End Specialists feat. Gay Joy - "It Comes from Inside (Inside-apella)"
Francois Dubois - "I Try"
BarBQ - "Myself"
Lance Jordan & Boryka - "Sun Is Rising (Ruff Mix)"
Julien Jabre - "Swimming Places (Sebastian Ingrosso Re-Edit)"
And If - "Finest Dream (Silicone Soul Remix)"
Booka Shade - "In White Rooms (Electrochemie Remix)"
Simian Mobile Disco - "Hustler"
The Ballroom - "Remember Me"
Deetron feat. Paris the Black Fu - "The Afterlife"
Lula - "The DJ, The Music & Me (Peace Division Remix)"
DJ Simi and DJ Marotta - "My House"
Yoshimoto - "Du What U Du (Markus Schulz Remix)"
Dubfire - "I Feel Speed (Club Mix)"
X-Press 2 feat. Rob Harvey - "Kill 100 (Carl Craig Remix)"

Disc two
Angel Lopez - "The First Rebirth (FX DJ Tool)"
Nitzer Ebb - "Control I'm Here (Dubfire's Jamrock Remix)"
U&K - "The Sax Track"
Nic Fanciulli - "Lucky Heather (Dubfire's Lucky 13 Remix Parts 1 + 2 - iTunes Edit)"
Le Noir - "My MTV (The Dolphins Remix)"
Robbie Rivera - "Float Away (Dubfire's Casaplex Remix)"
DJ Vibe & Ithaka (Ithaka Darin Pappas) - "You" (aka We Are The Players)
Len Faki - "Die Rumpelkammer"
Depeche Mode - "Everything Counts (Oliver Huntemann & Stephan Bodzin Dub)"
Samuel L. Session - "Related"
Samuel L. Session - "Can You Relate"
Emanuel Heinstein - "Satellites"
Alexander Kowalski feat. Barca Baxant - "Start Chasing (Extrawelt Remix)"
Ellen Allien and Apparat - "Jet (Paul Kalkbrenner Remix)"

References

External links 
Official Release Information from Global Underground News Page

Global Underground
2007 compilation albums
2007 live albums
Deep Dish (band) compilation albums